Bob Hewitt and Frew McMillan were the defending champions and won in the final 6–4, 6–3 against Wojciech Fibak and Jan Kodeš.

Seeds

  Bob Hewitt /  Frew McMillan (champions)
  Wojciech Fibak /  Jan Kodeš (final)
  Brian Gottfried /  Sandy Mayer (semifinals)
  František Pala /  Balázs Taróczy (semifinals)

Draw

External links
 1977 Fischer-Grand Prix Doubles draw

Doubles